The HKU University of the Arts Utrecht is a performing arts and visual arts educational institution in Utrecht, Netherlands.

Overview 
The institution has 680 teachers and staff members. The HKU cooperates with the Utrecht University at many levels.

The HKU University of the Arts Utrecht offers preparatory courses, bachelor's and master's programmes and research degrees in fine art, design, music, theatre, media, games and interaction and arts management. With more than 3,900 students, the HKU is one of the largest art and culture-oriented institutes in Europe.

The HKU University of the Arts Utrecht is internationally oriented and involved in numerous international programmes and projects. The HKU maintains contact with almost 200 educational institutions abroad for the purpose of exchanging lecturers, students and projects. Almost 20% of the students come from outside the Netherlands. Foreign students can attend the HKU as a regular student, an exchange student in programmes such as Socrates/Erasmus, a bilateral exchange program or as an MA, MPhil or Ph.D. student. Since 1999 the HKU is an accredited institution of the Open University.

Faculty of Music
The Faculty of Music was a formed in 1987 as a result of the merger of the Utrecht Conservatory of Music, the Netherlands Institute for Church Music and the Netherlands Carillon School of Amersfoort.

Carillon School
The Netherlands Carillon School, founded in Amersfoort in 1953, is a Dutch school teaching carillon playing. Since its foundation, more than 250 students from eleven countries have studied there. They now preside over most of the 182 carillons in the Netherlands, and occupy positions in many other parts of the world. In 1985 the school became part of the Utrecht School of the Arts, Faculty of Music.

Each student of the Netherlands Carillon School can follow programs of study offered by the other schools.

Bachelor's programmes 
The HKU University of the Arts Utrecht offers bachelor courses and pathways in fine art, design, music, theatre, media, games and interaction, arts education and arts management.

Courses in English:
Bachelor of Fine Arts (partially)
Bachelor of Music

Courses in Dutch:
Bachelor of Arts and Economics 
Bachelor of Creative Media and Game Technologies
Bachelor of Design
Bachelor of Education
Bachelor of Theatre

Courses in English for Exchange students:
The HKU offers courses for international students, who wish to study 1 or 2 semesters abroad.

Master programmes 
At the Utrecht School of the Arts, you can choose from a variety of master's courses and pathways in English:
Master of Fine Arts in Scenography
Master of Arts in Fine Art
Master of Music, Performance
Master of Music, Music Design

Courses in Dutch:
Master of Education in Arts
Master Interior Architecture
Master Crossover Creativity

Other higher education institutions in Utrecht 
 University of Professional Education Utrecht (HU — Hogeschool Utrecht)
 Utrecht University (Universiteit Utrecht)
 University College Utrecht affiliated with Utrecht University

Notable alumni 

 Najib Amhali
 Pascal van Assendelft
 Barry Atsma
 Henze Boekhout
 Erik-Jan de Boer
 Floortje Dessing
 Diddo
 Jetske van den Elsen
 Martijn Fischer
 Wouter Hamel
 Rob Hornstra
 Janine Jansen
 Emmy Verhey
 Lies Visschedijk
 Herman Witkam
 Barbara Woof

See also 
 Higher Professional Education
 Utrecht Network

References

External links 
 Utrecht School of the Arts (HKU — Hogeschool voor de Kunsten Utrecht) — page in English.
Netherlands Carillon School

 
Vocational universities in the Netherlands
Performing arts education in the Netherlands
Arts in the Netherlands
Buildings and structures in Utrecht (city)
Education in Utrecht (city)